The June 2012 San Francisco general elections were held on June 5, 2012 in San Francisco, California. The elections included seats of various parties' county central committees and two San Francisco ballot measures.


Propositions 
Note: "City" refers to the San Francisco municipal government.

Proposition A 

Proposition A would change the permit system for awarding garbage disposal and recycling contracts to a competitive bidding process, prohibit a company from providing both garbage disposal and recycling services, require that the City own all recycling and garbage disposal facilities, and require the San Francisco Board of Supervisors to set garbage disposal rates.

Proposition B 

Proposition B would make it City policy to limit commercial and private events at Coit Tower and use revenues from its concessions for maintaining the tower and surrounding Pioneer Park.

External links 
 San Francisco Department of Elections

San Francisco 06
2012 06
Elections 06
San Francisco 06
2010s in San Francisco